Germán Parreño Boix (born 16 February 1993), known simply as Germán, is a Spanish professional footballer who plays for UD Ibiza as a goalkeeper.

Club career
Born in Elche, Alicante, Valencian Community, Germán joined RCD Espanyol's youth setup in 2007 from local Elche CF, aged 14. He made his senior debut with the B team, in Tercera División.

On 26 August 2013, Germán signed a new four-year deal with the Catalans, being also promoted to the main squad. On 8 December he played his first game as a professional, starting in a 2–2 away draw against Real Jaén in the round of 32 of the Copa del Rey (eventual 4–2 aggregate win).

Germán first appeared in La Liga on 6 April 2014, taking the place of suspended Kiko Casilla in a 4–1 loss at Sevilla FC. On 22 January of the following year, after losing his backup position to another youth graduate, Pau López, he was loaned to Segunda División club Racing de Santander until June.

On 18 August 2015, Germán moved to fellow league team Girona FC in a season-long loan deal. He played understudy to Isaac Becerra during his spell, and terminated his contract with Espanyol on 5 August 2016.

On 6 August 2016, Germán returned to his first club Elche. The following summer, he signed for UCAM Murcia CF in Segunda División B. Two years later, he joined UD Ibiza in the same league, agreeing to a contract until 30 June 2020 with the option for an additional season.

References

External links

1993 births
Living people
Spanish footballers
Footballers from Elche
Association football goalkeepers
La Liga players
Segunda División players
Segunda División B players
Tercera División players
RCD Espanyol B footballers
RCD Espanyol footballers
Racing de Santander players
Girona FC players
Elche CF players
UCAM Murcia CF players
UD Ibiza players